Mount Mitchell State Park is a  North Carolina state park in Yancey County, North Carolina in the United States. Established in 1915 by the state legislature, it became the first state park of North Carolina. By doing so, it also established the North Carolina State Parks System within the same bill.

Located at the end of NC 128 off the Blue Ridge Parkway near Burnsville, North Carolina, it includes the peak of Mount Mitchell, the highest peak east of the Mississippi River. From the parking lot, a steep paved path leads visitors to the summit and a raised observation platform with 360 degree views.  The grave of Elisha Mitchell, the professor who first noted the mountain's height, is located at the base of the observation platform. The old observation tower was torn down in early October 2006. The trail leading to the summit has been paved, and a new observation platform was constructed and opened to the public in January 2009.

An exhibit hall is open seasonally at the summit with information about the mountain's natural, cultural and historical heritage.  The park operates a restaurant and a small tent camping sites seasonally. The buildings were built in the 1950s and renovation is planned. Most visitors come between May and November because the only access is the Blue Ridge Parkway but Kevin Bischof, who became superintendent late in 2018, hopes to change that. The park is staffed year-round but most people would not be able to reach the park during the worst weather conditions.

The park had 398,000 visitors in 2017.

Trails lead to all these summits save Mount Hallback, and their exploration takes visitors away from the crowds on Mount Mitchell but to places similarly spectacular. About  of trails exist within the park in all.

Another popular destination reachable by trail within the park is Camp Alice, at an elevation of 5800 ft (1767.84 m) south of the summit of Mount Mitchell. This historic site is the location of a logging and, later, Civilian Conservation Corps tourist camp at the terminus of the old Mount Mitchell toll road. Lower Creek flows across the main trail at this point and it is one of the highest elevation perennial streams in the Appalachians, flowing through the Spruce-Fir forest. Openings here in the forest surrounded by evergreens resemble such openings near treeline in higher mountain ranges.

The park also serves as the finish line for The Assault on Mount Mitchell and the midpoint for the Mount Mitchell Challenge ultramarathon.

Nearby state parks
The following state parks and state forests are within  of Mount Mitchell State Park:
Chimney Rock State Park
Grandfather Mountain State Park
Lake James State Park
Lamar Alexander Rocky Fork State Park, Tennessee
Pisgah View State Park
Roan Mountain State Park, Tennessee
South Mountains State Park

See also
Mountains-to-Sea Trail

References

External links
 
 Detailed information about the park
 Hiking trail info for Mt. Mitchell

State parks of North Carolina
State parks of the Appalachians
Blue Ridge Mountains
Protected areas of Yancey County, North Carolina
Park, Mount Mitchell
Protected areas established in 1915
Museums in Yancey County, North Carolina
Natural history museums in North Carolina
Open-air museums in North Carolina
Civilian Conservation Corps in North Carolina
1915 establishments in North Carolina
National Natural Landmarks in North Carolina